Untied aid
is assistance given to developing countries which can be used to purchase goods and services in virtually all countries. It is contrasted with tied aid which stipulates that goods and services bought with it can only be purchased from the donor country or from a limited selection of countries.<ref>“Tied aid credits,” OECD Glossary of Statistical Terms</u>, OECD.org, 18 July 2007 <http://stats.oecd.org/glossary/detail.asp?ID=3089>.</ref>

One of the main arguments in favour of untied aid is that tied aid can create important distortions in the market by limiting the number of countries in which the recipient can make purchases. The limitations impede the recipient country's ability to find the most cost-effective way to spend the aid they receive. It is estimated that goods and services purchased with tied aid cost 15-30% more than comparable goods and services acquired with untied aid. Furthermore, tied aid often favours capital-intensive goods and advising primarily in the donor country's area of expertise. That may lead recipient countries to make purchases which are inappropriate for realising their development goals.

In addition, the administration of tied aid requires larger bureaucracies in both the donor and recipient countries. Untying aid would presumably give recipient countries greater freedom to choose how they spend their resources, focusing on the goods and services they need most and allowing them to purchase from the most cost-effective sources. Untying aid would allow it to be more efficiently employed, effectively increasing its value.

See also
 Tied aid
 Phantom aid

References

External links
 OECD Untied Aid
 OECD Development Co-operation Fundamentals - Untying ODA

International development
Aid
Corruption